This is the complete list of Pan American Games medalists in diving from 1951 to 2019.

Men's events

1m springboard

3m springboard

3m synchronized springboard

10m platform

10m synchronized platform

Women's events

1m springboard

3m springboard

3m synchronized springboard

10m platform

10m synchronized platform

See also
 Diving at the Pan American Games

References

Diving